Hans Meyer may refer to:

 Hans Meyer (actor) (1925–2020), South African actor
 Hans Meyer (artist) (1846-1919), German artist and engraver
 Hans Meyer (geographer) (1858–1929), German geographer
 Hans Meyer (footballer) (born 1942), German football manager and former player
 Hans Meyer (SS officer), Knight's Cross recipient, see List of Knight's Cross of the Iron Cross recipients
 Hans Joseph Meyer (1913–2009), teacher at Bunce Court School
 Hans Leopold Meyer (1871–1942), Austrian chemist
 Hans Werner Meyer (born 1964), German film and television actor
 Hans Horst Meyer (1853–1939), German pharmacologist
 Hans Joachim Meyer (born 1936), German politician

See also
 Hans Mayer (disambiguation)
 Hannes Meyer (1889–1954), Swiss Bauhaus architect
 Hans Meier (1918–2007), German officer, recipient of the Knights Cross
 Jean Améry (Hanns Chaim Mayer, 1912–1978), Auschwitz survivor and Holocaust writer